Atteva sidereoides is a moth of the Attevidae family. It is endemic to the Dominican Republic.

References

External links 
A review of the New World Atteva (Walker) moths (Yponomeutidae, Attevinae)

Endemic fauna of the Dominican Republic
Insects of the Dominican Republic
Moths described in 2009
Attevidae